Terminal Purabaya (English:Purabaya Bus Station), or more popularly known as Terminal Bungurasih is the busiest bus station in Indonesia (up to 120,000 passengers per day). This terminal is located in the outskirts of Surabaya, in Waru, Sidoarjo. 

This bus station serves local and inter-island routes.

References 

Buildings and structures in Surabaya
Transport in East Java
Bus stations in Indonesia